The 2017 SIU Edwardsville Cougars softball team represents Southern Illinois University Edwardsville (SIUE) during the 2017 NCAA Division I softball season. The Cougars, led by twenty-ninth year head coach Sandy Montgomery, play their home games at Cougar Field on the SIUE campus  as a member of the Ohio Valley Conference (OVC).

Preseason
Twelve players returned from the 2016 squad that finished with a 28–26 overall record (15–11 in the OVC) and finished in 4th place in the regular season and as runners-up in the OVC championship tournament. They were joined by six incoming freshmen, a redshirted freshman, a transfer from another Division I program, and the return of Haley Chambers-Book, the three-time All-OVC First Team member and 2015 OVC Pitcher of the Year who did not play in 2016.

The Cougars were undefeated in six Fall contests against Saint Louis University and several community colleges.

The Cougars were picked by the coaches and sports information directors of the Ohio Valley Conference to finish second in the conference.

Regular season
As usual, the 2017 season casts the Cougars in the role of road warriors, with only 17 home games on their 54-game regular-season schedule.

The schedule opened with tournaments in Louisiana, Alabama, Texas, and Florida and includes 38 schools from 17 states. Although the early season schedule is busy, the Cougars face only four teams that were in the 2016 NCAA tournament, including two that were ranked in the preseason Top 25.

The Cougars opened the season traveling to three weekend tournaments in the South.

They started by winning the "Mardi Gras Classic" at Louisiana-Monroe with a 5–0 record. In Game 4 of the tournament, Haley Chambers-Book struck out 14 opposing batters, raising her career total to 748 and breaking the previous SIUE record of 737, set by Erika Taylor during 2008–11 

After picking up two wins and setting the SIUE career strikeout record, Haley Chambers-Book was named the season's first Ohio Valley Conference Pitcher of the Week.

The Cougars' first loss came in 2nd ranked Auburn's home opener, played before the start of their "Plainsman Invitational." In the tourney, the Cougars again lost to Auburn, beat Mercer twice, and beat Evansville to finish second in the tournament with a 3–1 record.

At the Baylor Tournament in Waco, Texas, the Cougars went 2–1 in the preliminary round-robin, defeating St. Francis (PA) and Massachusetts and falling to the 24th ranked hosts to earn the #2 seed.  They beat St. Francis (PA)  in the semifinals, but lost the championship to #24 Baylor 3–2.

The Cougars played three neutral site games prior to the "Under Armour Showcase". On their first day in Clearwater, they beat Penn 3–1 The next day, Haley Chambers-Book pitched an 11 strikeout one-hitter to South Dakota State before Emily Ingles and Ashley Koziol threw the first combined no-hitter (33rd overall) in school history against LaSalle.

On the first day of the "Under Armour Showcase", The Cougars defeated Holy Cross 4–2 and Providence 3–0. The come-from-behind victory over Holy Cross was the 1,000th win of coach Sandy Montgomery's 29-year career, making her only the 32nd head coach in all divisions to top the 1,000 win mark.

On Day 2 of the  "Under Armour Showcase", The Cougars wore their hitting shoes, beating Fort Wayne 8–0 in six innings and St. Joseph's 11–2 in five.

The Cougars closed out the "Under Armour Showcase" and their Florida trip with a 4–3 win over South Dakota State, running their win streak to eight games. Of the twenty-one teams playing four to six games in the "Under Armour Showcase", only the Cougars (5–0) and Central Michigan (4–0) were undefeated.

After earning four wins during the week, including having the larger share of the combined no-hitter against LaSalle, freshman Emily Ingles was named the Ohio Valley Conference Pitcher of the Week.

On March 13, the Cougars debuted in the national rankings, receiving votes in both the USA Today/NFCA Coaches and the ESPN.com/USA Softball polls.

The Cougars hosted their first home tournament since 2008 and the first of the Division I era at Cougar Field. They beat Toledo and Northern Kentucky, but fell to tournament champions Ball State.

SIUE hosted unranked but highly touted Kansas of the Big 12 Conference in a mid-week game.  Haley Chambers-Book had a perfect game going into the seventh inning before yielding two hits and a run in a 7–1 victory.

The double-header versus Tennessee State was an unexpected pair of pitchers' duels. In the first game, TSU's Lauren Powell threw a four-hitter at the Cougars, while Haley Chambers-Book countered with her fifth career no-hit game; two runs scored without a hit in the third inning brought the win to SIUE. In the second game, Lauren Woodard limited the Cougars to five hits while Emily Ingles held the Lady Tigers to only four; two of the Cougar hits came in the bottom of the ninth and scored the winning run.

Following her no-hitter versus Tennessee State and her one-hitter against Kansas, Haley Chambers-Book earned her second  OVC Pitcher of the Week award of the year.

Belmont, one of the hottest-hitting teams in Division I, came to Cougar Field with a record of 24–7 against the Cougars' 24–5. Haley Chambers-Book held the Bruins to three hits and one run while striking out seven in winning Game 1 2–1. In Game 2, the Belmont bats came alive after the first time through the lineup, and the Bruins scored three in the 4th and five in the 5th to gain an 8–2 win.

For the third season in a row, the Cougars traveled to Carbondale to face the Salukis in the home stadium of their elder sister school.  While Haley Chambers-Book struck out 11 in a four-hit shutout, the Cougars used three straight hits, a passed ball, and a two-base advance on a sacrifice fly to take a 3–0 lead in the third and added an insurance run in the seventh for the 4–0 victory.

UT Martin, the second of four OVC teams in the top 50 hitting teams in the NCAA, came into Cougar Field with a record of 24–8. Haley Chambers-Book threw a one-hit shutout at the Skyhawks in her 15th win, as the Cougars scored five runs on eight hits; the score was held down by UT Martin pulling off three double-plays.  As Belmont had done in their second game, the Skyhawks got their vaunted hitting act underway in the second time through the batting order. UTM scored one in the 3rd, two in the 5th, and four in the 7th on twelve hits, while the Cougars only eked out three runs on four hits.

Her shutout wins over SIU and UTM gained Haley Chambers-Book consecutive  OVC Pitcher of the Week awards---her third of the year.

The Cougars were rude hosts as they entertained the Bradley Braves. Haley Chambers-Book tossed  a three-hitter in her sixth shutout of the season. The Cougars scored ten runs on twelve hits to shorten the game to five innings under the mercy rule.

In the first game of a four-game OVC road trip, the Cougars blew out Eastern Kentucky 11–0 in Game one of the first doubleheader as Haley Chambers-Book struck out thirteen in a two-hit game. In Game 2, the Cougars needed three pitchers and eight innings to gain the 7–5 win.  Chambers-Book earned her 18th win in a two-inning relief appearance. Moving on to Morehead State, SIUE used two homers in the first game and three doubles in the second to sweep the Eagles 4–0 and 2–1.

With three complete-game shutouts and a win in relief, Haley Chambers-Book got her third consecutive  OVC Pitcher of the Week award---her fourth of 2017. Hitting .412 with three runs, two doubles, two home runs and eight RBI for the week, Sarah Lopesilvero was named OVC Co-Player of the Week.

The Cougars took a mid-week trip to Urbana for their first-ever meeting with the Illinois Fighting Illini, who carried the NCAA's #25 RPI (versus SIUE's #41) and were ranked #27 in both national Top 25 polls. The Cougars took the lead in the top of the 3rd only to have the Illini tie the game in the bottom half of the inning. In the 4th, SIUE's nationally 6th-ranked defense faltered, committing two errors in allowing Illinois to score four runs; two unearned. Both teams had six hits, as Haley Chambers-Book pitched a complete game while the Illini used four pitchers in their 5–2 win.

Haley Chambers-Book earned the wins in both halves of the doubleheader with Southeast Missouri State, her 20th and 21st of the season. In Game 1, Chambers-Book and Emily Ingles held the Redhawks to three his in the Cougars' 13th shutout of the season. In Game 2, SEMO took a 1–0 lead in the top of the 5th and a 4–3 lead in the top of the 7th before SIUE would tie the game in the bottom of both innings. The Cougars won on a bases-loaded single by senior second baseman Allison Smiley in the bottom of the 10th inning.

Crossing the Mississippi to play at Saint Louis, the Cougars struck early, scoring 3 in the first. The Billikens tied the score in the second, but SIUE scored more runs in the 4th, 5th, and 6th innings to take win #35 of the season 7–3. The Cougars used three pitchers, with Haley Chambers-Book picking up another win in relief--- her 22nd.

For the first-ever meeting between two top 50 RPI teams from the OVC, the Cougars traveled to Alabama to face league-leading Jacksonville State. The Gamecocks used home runs to take both games. A walk-off homer won Game i 5–3 in 8 innings. A sixth-inning homer gave JSU a 2–1 lead that was preserved by a seventh-inning diving catch in center field and throw to first for a double play.

The Sunday double-header at Tennessee Tech was postponed due to inclement weather. Then, the scheduled game at Missouri State was cancelled because of poor field condition.

On April 24 Haley Chambers-Book was drafted by the Texas Charge as the 14th overall pick in the 2017 National Pro Fastpitch (NPF) College Draft.

The Saturday doubleheader versus the Austin Peay Governors was moved to Friday, but it was still delayed four hours in starting by thunderstorms. In Game 1, Haley Chambers-Book threw a 9 strikeout two-hitter in an 8–0 five inning rout. In Game 2, Emily Ingles had a no-hitter into the seventh in her 10 strikeout one-hit 1–0 win, With the sweep, the Cougars moved back into second place in the OVC race. Chambers-Book's 23rd win moved her into second place on the Cougars' career wins list, passing coach Sandy Montgomery.

With the doubleheader against Murray State rained out, five of the Cougars' last nine games were cancelled due to weather and/or field conditions.

In the season-ending doubleheader, SIUE faced cross-state rivals, the Eastern Illinois Panthers. In Game 1, Haley Chambers-Book pitched her tenth complete game shutout of the season. It was also her third one-hit shutout of the season, and the Cougars took the win 6–0, led by Allison Smiley's 4 RBIs. In Game 2, EIU built a 7–0 lead before the Cougars seventh inning comeback effort fell short, 7–4.

After pitching her tenth complete game shutout of the season and raising her record to 24–6, Haley Chambers-Book was named  OVC Co-Pitcher of the Week---her fifth  award of 2017.

Honors
The Ohio Valley Conference Awards were announced at a banquet in Oxford, Alabama prior to the start of the league tournament.  Senior Haley Chambers-Book was named OVC Pitcher of the Year and a member of the All-OVC First Team. The Pitcher of the Year was her second award, having also won it in 2015, and the First Team selection was her fourth, having earned the distinction  2013–15. Senior second baseman Allison Smiley, senior shortstop Sarah Lopesilvero. and sophomore center fielder Alyssa Heren were named to the All-OVC Second Team; it was Heren's second consecutive selection.. Lopesilvero, a transfer from Louisville,  freshman first baseman Zoe Schafer, and freshman pitcher Emily Ingles were named to the  OVC All-Newcomer Team.

Postseason
SIUE and UT Martin tied for second place in the regular season, and UTM was given the #2 seed in the OVC Tournament held at Choccolocco Park in Oxford, Alabama, with the Cougars seeded third.

In the tournament's opening game, Eastern Kentucky struck first when the first batter walked, then scored on a one-out double. The Cougars evened things up in the 3rd with a hit, sacrifice bunt, error, and sacrifice fly. Both Haley Chambers-Book and EKU pitchers Mollie Paulick and Alex Salberg threw three hitters. While the Colonels' two other hits were harmless, the Cougars' two others were a two-run fifth inning homer by Tess Eby and a seventh inning solo shot by Chambers-Book to close the scoring at 4–1.

The second-round game against $2 seed UT Martin was another pitchers' duel with both Haley Chambers-Book and Brooke Kennedy tossing two-hit games. The Skyhawks scored first with a walk, stolen base, and double in the second inning. The Cougars rallied in the fourth, picking up two runs on a walk, their two hits, and a UTM throwing error, sending SIUE to face top-seeded Jacksonville State and UTM to the losers bracket.

Top seeded Jacksonville State took control with three runs on three hits and a Cougar error in the top of the first inning of the first semifinal. SIUE got back one run in the bottom of the inning, but JSU scored one more in the fifth and two in the seventh, while the Cougars managed only a seventh inning homer by Sarah Lopesilvero in losing 6–2. The Gamecocks advanced to the finals, while SIUE must play the winner of the UT Martin–Eastern Kentucky game in the second semifinal for a chance at a rematch with JSU.

In the second semifinal game, Haley Chambers-Book allowed no hits in her five inning start, with the only UT Martin base-runner caught stealing. SIUE scored one run in the second and five in the third. The Skyhaws managed to get a run on three two-out hits in the sixth, but the Cougars got that back in the seventh, winning 7–1. Both Alyssa Heren and Sarah Lopesilvero had three his in four at-bats as SIUE advanced to its fourth consecutive OVC Final.

The Cougars jumped out on top in the first inning, scoring four runs on three hits and two Gamecock errors. But JSU got through to Haley Chambers-Book, who had only allowed ten home runs all season, getting one in the second, a two-run shot in the third, and another solo longball in the seventh. Then, following a triple, the SIUE star then threw an even more rare wild pitch, allowing JSU to take the lead in the eventual 5-4 win. The Gamecockjs earned the OVC's automatic win to the NCAA Championship tournament, and the Cougars must wait to see if their RPI remains high enough for an at-large bid.

Cougar seniors Haley Chambers-Book, Allison Smiley, and Sarah Lopesilvero were named to the Ohio Valley Conference All-Tournament Team.

The NCAA tournament selection committee chose Wisconsin, Oregon State, and Fresno State, all with lesser RPIs than SIUE, preventing the Cougars from becoming the first OVC team to get an at-large bid. Six teams that the Cougars played were among the 64 teams in the tournament.  SIUE could have accepted an invitation to the inaugural National Invitational Softball Championship (NISC), but the season's financial resources had been expended in the strong early-season schedule with its extended trips to tournaments in Louisiana, Alabama, Texas, and Florida.

Haley Chambers-Book was named to the National Fastpitch Coaches Association's All-Mideast Region First Team.  Allison Smiley was named tor the  All-Mideast Region Second Team. This was Chambers-Book's third All-Region selection and Smiley's first.

Haley Chambers-Book was named by Fastpitchnews.com as a Second Team All-American Pitcher. She became the first Cougars softball player to be named an All-American since the program moved to Division I in 2009.

Roster
Buff background indicates players returning from 2016. Pink background indicates player returning from 2015.

↑ = Team captains

Schedule 

|-
!colspan=9| Louisiana–Monroe Warhawks Mardi Gras Classic 

|- 
!colspan=9|

|-
!colspan=9| Auburn Tigers Plainsman Invitational 

|-
!colspan=9| Baylor Invitational 

|-
!colspan=9| Neutral site games

|-
!colspan=9| USF Series – Under Armour Showcase 

|-
!colspan=9| SIUE Tournament 

|- 
!colspan=9|

|-
!colspan=9| 2017 Ohio Valley Conference softball tournament
|-

References

SIU Edwardsville
SIU Edwardsville Cougars softball seasons